Jan Kula (2 February 1922 – 6 April 1995) was a Polish ski jumper. He competed in the individual event at the 1948 Winter Olympics.

References

External links
 

1922 births
1995 deaths
Polish male ski jumpers
Olympic ski jumpers of Poland
Ski jumpers at the 1948 Winter Olympics
Sportspeople from Zakopane
20th-century Polish people